John Lewis House may mean:
Dr. John Lewis House, listed on the National Register of Historic Places (NRHP) in St. Matthews, Kentucky
John L. Lewis House, listed on the NRHP in Springfield, Illinois
John W. Lewis House, listed on the NRHP in Marshall, Illinois
John Lewis House (Opelousas, Louisiana), listed on the NRHP in Louisiana
John C. and Augusta (Covell) Lewis House, listed on the NRHP in Whitehall, Michigan
John S. and Izola Lewis House, NRHP in Orem, Utah

See also
Lewis House (disambiguation)